Sondur Dam is located in Dhamtari District of Chhattisgarh in India. It was constructed in 1988 across Sondur River. The catchment area of the Sondur river up to the dam is 518 km2.

References 

Dams in Chhattisgarh
Dams on the Mahanadi River
Dams completed in 1988
Dhamtari district
1988 establishments in Madhya Pradesh
20th-century architecture in India